François Bidard (born 19 March 1992) is a French cyclist, who currently rides for UCI WorldTeam . He was named in the startlist for the 2016 Vuelta a España and the start list for the 2017 Giro d'Italia.

Major results

2013
 8th Overall Tour du Gévaudan Languedoc-Roussillon
2014
 5th Piccolo Giro di Lombardia
2015
 4th Overall Rhône-Alpes Isère Tour
2018
 5th Overall Circuit de la Sarthe
2019
 9th Trofeo Laigueglia
2022
 2nd Zwift - 3R Volcano Circuit - 6 Laps B Category

Grand Tour general classification results timeline

References

External links

1992 births
Living people
French male cyclists
Sportspeople from Orne
Cyclists from Normandy